Hyposmocoma erebogramma is a species of moth of the family Cosmopterigidae. It was first described by Edward Meyrick in 1935. It is endemic to the Hawaiian island of Oahu. The type locality is Kahuku.

The larvae feed on Hesperomannia species.

External links

erebogramma
Endemic moths of Hawaii
Moths described in 1935